Business Before Honesty is a 1918 American silent comedy film featuring Oliver Hardy.

Cast
 Harry Gribbon as Willie Steal
 Oliver Hardy as The Blind Man (credited as Babe Hardy)
 Eddie Barry as Nellie
 May Emory as The Woman (as Mae Emory)
 Helen Lynch as Her Daughter

Reception
Like many American films of the time, Business Before Honesty was subject to restrictions and cuts by city and state film censorship boards. For example, the Chicago Board of Censors required cuts, in Reel 1, of two closeups of a fifty cent piece, and, Reel 2, scene of man looking suggestively at seat after first scene of pouring gasoline into safe.

See also
 List of American films of 1918
 Oliver Hardy filmography

References

External links

1918 films
American silent short films
American black-and-white films
1918 comedy films
1918 short films
Silent American comedy films
American comedy short films
1910s American films